"Wasted on You" is a song performed by American rock band Evanescence. The song was released as a digital download on April 24, 2020 by BMG as the lead single from the band's fifth studio album, The Bitter Truth. The song was written by the band and produced by Nick Raskulinecz.

Music video
An official music video to accompany the release of "Wasted on You" was first released onto YouTube on 24 April 2020. The video was filmed by each member of the band on their phones while in isolation, and directed by P. R. Brown in collaboration with the band through facetime.

Awards and nominations

Personnel
Credits adapted from Tidal.
 Nick Raskulinecz – producer, mixing engineer, recording engineer
 Evanescence – composer, lyricist, associated performer
 Nathan Yarborough – engineer
 Ted Jensen – mastering engineer

Charts

Release history

References

2020 songs
2020 singles
Evanescence songs
Gothic metal songs
Electronic rock songs